Escapade is a 1932 Pre-Code American crime film directed by Richard Thorpe and starring Jameson Thomas, Sally Blane and Anthony Bushell. It is also known by the alternative title of Dangerous Ground.

Cast
 Jameson Thomas as John Whitney  
 Sally Blane as Kay Whitney  
 Anthony Bushell as Philip Whitney  
 Thomas E. Jackson as Bennie  
 Walter Long as Gympy McLane  
 Carmelita Geraghty as Mildred Warren  
 Phillips Smalley as Wally Hines  
 David Mir as Ambrose - the Poet  
 Edward Cooper as Baxter - the Butler

References

Bibliography
 Pitts, Michael R. Poverty Row Studios, 1929-1940. McFarland & Company, 2005.

External links
 

1932 films
1932 crime films
1930s English-language films
American crime films
Films directed by Richard Thorpe
American black-and-white films
Chesterfield Pictures films
1930s American films